Spartiniphaga was a genus of moths of the family Noctuidae. It is now considered to be a synonym of Photedes.

Former species
 Spartiniphaga carterae is now Photedes carterae Schweitzer, 1983
 Spartiniphaga includens is now Photedes includens (Walker, 1858)
 Spartiniphaga inops is now Photedes inops (Grote, 1881)
 Spartiniphaga panatela is now Photedes panatela (Smith, 1904)

References
Natural History Museum Lepidoptera genus database
Spartiniphaga at funet

Hadeninae